Edeowie glass is a natural glass, or lechatelierite, found in the Australian state of South Australia. It is slag-like, opaque material found as vesicular free forms or sheet-like/ropy masses. The region in which this glass is found is mostly restricted to concentrations correlated to the ancient shoreline terrace sequence at the locality. 
It is typically black in appearance, but can occur as variegated grey-green with various streak-like impurities. Pale grey and red-brownish surfaces can be caused by chemical weathering (oxidation, mineralization) and devitrification.

Origin

Proposed origins for Edeowie and other similar lechatelierites include Pleistocene grassland fires, lightning strikes, or hypervelocity impact by one or several asteroids or comets.  Some features, such as planar deformation features (PDFs) in quartz crystals found within and associated with Edeowie glass, are usually caused by extreme pressures and temperatures.

Interval of formation 

Edeowie glass yields dates spanning 0.67-0.07 mya (~670,000-70,000 BP), but some outlier dates are as recent as the middle Holocene.

See also
Darwin glass
Fulgurite
Impactite
Libyan desert glass
Shocked quartz

References

External links
 Geoscience Australia, 2004, Edeowie glass. Stratigraphic Units Database.
 Perkins, S., 2001, Desert glass: is it baked Australia? Science News. v. 160, no. 21, p. 331.

Glass in nature

da:Ørkenglas
de:Libysches Wüstenglas
eo:Dezerta vitro
fr:Verre Libyque
pl:Szkło pustynne